Franz Hegner (18 September 1919 – 30 January 1983) was a Swiss modern pentathlete. He competed at the 1948 Summer Olympics.

References

External links
 

1919 births
1983 deaths
Swiss male modern pentathletes
Olympic modern pentathletes of Switzerland
Modern pentathletes at the 1948 Summer Olympics